Roaring City is a 1951 American crime film produced and directed by William Berke for Spartan Productions and released by the low-budget Lippert Pictures. The film stars Hugh Beaumont, Edward Brophy and Richard Travis.  It is a "dual purpose" B movie, meaning it could contained two story lines so that it could be released as two half hour television shows later. A private detective investigated a boxer's sudden death in San Francisco.

Plot

Cast
 Hugh Beaumont as Dennis O'Brien  
 Edward Brophy as 'Professor' Frederick Simpson Schicker  
 Richard Travis as Inspector Bruger  
 Joan Valerie as Irma Rand  
 Wanda McKay as Sylvia Rand  
 Rebel Randall as Gail Chase  
 William Tannen as Ed Gannon  
 Greg McClure as Steve Belzig, alias Vic Lundy  
 Anthony Warde as Bill Rafferty 
 Abner Biberman as Eddie Paige  
 Stanley Price as Harry Barton  
 A.J. Roth 
 Paul Brooks as Ted Fallon, alias Steve Rand

See also
Danger Zone (1951)
Pier 23 (1951)

References

External links
 

1951 films
1951 crime films
1950s sports films
1950s English-language films
American crime films
Films directed by William A. Berke
Films set in San Francisco
American boxing films
Lippert Pictures films
American black-and-white films
1950s American films